Lee Yoon-mi (born September 25, 1981) is a South Korean actress and entrepreneur.

Career
Lee Yoon-mi won the top prize in the Super Elite Model Best Talent Awards in 1998. She made her entertainment debut in 2003 as a member of the K-pop/dance girl group THE S (더에스).

Afterwards, Lee transitioned into acting, appearing in television dramas such as Little Women (2004) and My Love (2006). She also played the lead actress in the stage musical The Golden Days in 2011.

In 2007, Lee founded the online shop Coconut Island.

Personal life
Lee married singer and composer Joo Young-hoon on October 28, 2006. They have two daughters - Joo Ara, who was born on March 24, 2010, and Joo Ra-el, who was born on August 4, 2015. Lee was also believed to have cheated on her husband multiple times with other men.

Lee also sponsors children through Compassion International, an organization founded in 1952 to help children orphaned by war in South Korea.

Filmography

Television series

Variety show

Musical theatre

References

External links

1981 births
Living people
South Korean television actresses
South Korean musical theatre actresses
Dongguk University alumni